Saint-Thibault-des-Vignes is a commune in the Seine-et-Marne department in the Île-de-France region in north-central France.

Population
Inhabitants of Saint-Thibault-des-Vignes are known as Théobaldiens in French.

Education
There are three school groups (combined preschools and elementary schools) in the commune: Marie Curie, Pierre Villette, and Edouard Thomas. There is one junior high school, Collège public Léonard de Vinci.

Area public senior high schools:
 Lycée polyvalent Arche Gédon - Torcy
 Lycée Van Dongen - Lagny-sur-Marne
 Lycée Martin Luther King - Bussy-Saint-Georges

Area private schools:
 Collège privé Saint Laurent - Lagny-sur-Marne

Twin towns
Saint-Thibault-des-Vignes is twinned with:

  Badia Polesine, Italy

See also
Communes of the Seine-et-Marne department

References

External links

Official site 
1999 Land Use, from IAURIF (Institute for Urban Planning and Development of the Paris-Île-de-France région) 

Communes of Seine-et-Marne
Val de Bussy